Shira Nayman (born April 26, 1960) is a novelist and short story writer best known for her collection Awake in the Dark, published in 2006. She lives in Brooklyn, New York, and Highland Park, New Jersey, with her husband, the psychologist and writer, Louis Sass.

Early life and education
Nayman was born in South Africa and moved to Melbourne, Australia at a young age. There, she was raised in a community of mostly Holocaust survivors. She has said that this, along with her own family's escape from Eastern Europe during the pogroms of the early 20th century, has inspired her fiction.

Nayman graduated from Melbourne's Monash University, with a Bachelor of Science in physiology and psychology. After graduating, she spent a year studying literature and history at Hebrew University in Jerusalem before moving to the United States, where she received her doctorate in Clinical Psychology from Rutgers University. After completing a two-year post-doctoral fellowship in psychology at New York Hospital-Cornell University Medical Center, Nayman earned her master's degree in English and Comparative Literature at Columbia University in New York, in 1990.

Career

Awake in the Dark
Nayman's first book, a collection featuring a novella and short stories, was published by Scribner in 2006. Like most of her work, Awake in the Dark takes the Second World War as its subject matter, portraying the lives of children of Holocaust victims and perpetrators as they struggle with their parents' legacy. Newsday named it one of the best books of 2006, writing, "The bleak, beautiful and deftly plotted stories [...] are like nothing out there, taking as their theme the collateral damage of Nazism, delivered in many cases with an O. Henry twist.” Karen R. Long gave the book a glowing review in the Cleveland Plain Dealer, writing that, in these stories, the Holocaust "is the smoldering demon that reaches across generations, scraping its talons into the interior lives of children and grandchildren who were, metaphorically and literally, left in the dark." It was also named a notable book of the year by the San Francisco Chronicle.

The Listener
Nayman followed up the success of Awake in the Dark with a debut novel, The Listener, which was published by Scribner in 2009. A psychological drama that takes place in a mental asylum in upstate New York in the aftermath of World War II, The Listener expanded on many of the themes she had investigated in her previous work by exploring the havoc historical trauma plays with the psyche and illuminating the uncertain boundary between sanity and insanity. It was praised as "an honest look at the way trauma and violence afflict an entire generation's psyche," and elsewhere described as a "gripping narrative with style and depth." It was listed as an Editors Choice in the New York Times.

A Mind of Winter

Her second novel, A Mind of Winter, was published by Akashic Books in 2012. This time coming at the Second World War by way of Shanghai, London, and Long Island, A Mind of Winter is a psychological thriller that once again asks how war can shape identity and experience. Named one of Library Journal's "Best 2012 Indie Novels," A Mind of Winter was well received by critics, praised for having "the beauty and elegance of a Victorian novel," and for "tak[ing] the reader on a journey into the abyss of human experience."

River

River, a crossover adult/young adult novel, was  published in April, 2020, by Guernica  Editions.

Shoreline

Nayman's new book, Shoreline, will be published by Guernica Editions in 2024. 

Shoreline is a nontraditional, creative memoir taking up the theme of intergenerational wandering and dislocation, highlighting the resonant connections that wind through fractured but binding histories.

Other publications

Nayman has also published fiction and nonfiction in publications such as The Atlantic, Cousin Corinne's, The Georgia Review, The New England Review, and Psychoanalysis and Contemporary Thought. A short story commissioned by NPR, "Moon Landing," was broadcast in December 2010, and was chosen as one of eight stories to appear in the "Best of Hanukkah Lights" broadcast. Two chapter excerpts from Nayman's new book, Shoreline, were published in Tablet Magazine (November, 2020, and June, 2021).  Another excerpt, Moon Landing, was published in Tikkun Magazine in 2021. </ref>.

Teaching and consulting

Nayman has taught psychology at Rutgers University, literature at Columbia University, and fiction writing at Barnard College. She has also taught in the Program of Narrative Medicine at Columbia University.

In addition to her writing and teaching career, Nayman is a marketing consultant who has developed positioning strategy for major brands and product launches for such Fortune 100 companies as Microsoft, Hershey, AOL, and political campaigns, including the Center for National Policy and Hillary Clinton's United States Senate campaign. After twenty-three years with Strategic Frameworking, Inc., Nayman founded her own company, Shira Nayman Consulting, in 2012. www.shiranayman.com  She specializes in in-depth psychological research as well as children's and women's issues.

Awards 
Nayman has received three-year-long grants for fiction writing from the Australia Council for the Arts Literature Board. She is also the recipient of the Cape Branch Award for an Emerging Woman Writer (2011), and a fiction-writing grant from the Hadassah-Brandeis Institute (2011). Shira was a 2019 MacDowell Fellow.

References

External links 
 Official website
 shira nayman consulting 
 "Houses and Souls, Haunted by Holocaust Ghosts," New York Times
 Interview in The Atlantic
 Interview on "The Bob Edwards Show"
 Interview with Julie Burstein on The Listener
 Interview with Julie Burstein on A Mind of Winter

1960 births
Living people
21st-century American novelists
American women novelists
21st-century American women writers